The Argentine presidential election of 1860 was held on 6 February to choose the second president of the Argentine Confederation. Santiago Derqui was elected president.

The Buenos Aires Province seceded from the Confederation as the State of Buenos Aires on 11 September 1852 and did not participate in elections until 1862.

Results

Results by Province

Notes

References
 
 
 
 
 

1860 elections in South America
1860 in Argentina
1860
Elections in Argentina